David or Dave Hunt may refer to:

Sports
 David Hunt (footballer, born 1982), English football defender (Oxford United)
 David Hunt (footballer, born 1959), English football midfielder (Notts County)
 David Hunt (footballer, born 1980), English football defender (Darlington)
 David Hunt (racing driver) (1960–2015), English racing driver
 David Hunt (sailor) (born 1934), English sailor
 David Hunt (rower) (born 1991), South African rower
 David Hunt (badminton) (born 1945), English badminton player

Others
 David Hunt (actor) (born 1953), English actor
 David Hunt, Baron Hunt of Wirral (born 1942), British Conservative politician
 David Hunt (botanist) (1938–2019), English botanist and taxonomist
 David Hunt (diplomat) (1913–1998), Mastermind winner and former British ambassador to Brazil
 David Hunt (gangster) (born 1961), English organised crime boss
 David Hunt (judge) (1935–2019), Australian judge
 David Hunt (ornithologist) (1934–1985), English ornithologist and birdwatcher
 David Hunt (planter) (1779–1861), American plantation owner
 David Hunt (video game streamer), known online as GrandPooBear, a video game streamer, speedrunner, and creator of Kaizo Mario levels
 Dave Hunt (Christian apologist) (1926–2013), American theologian
 Dave Hunt (musician), English heavy metal singer
 Dave Hunt (Oregon politician) (born 1967), member of Oregon's State House of Representatives and former Speaker of the House
 Dave Hunt (artist) (1942–2017), American comic book artist